Dormi amore, la situazione non è buona is the 40th studio album by famous Italian singer and actor Adriano Celentano, issued November 23, 2007 by label Ariola Records. It was certified four times platinum by the Federation of the Italian Music Industry.

Track listing

Charts

Certifications

References

External links 
 
  
 
 Official site of album 

Adriano Celentano albums
2007 albums
Ariola Records albums